The Goldschmidt House, also known as Casa Tres Vistas, is located at 243 Avenida La Cuesta in San Clemente, California. It was designed in Spanish Colonial Revival style by architect Paul R. Williams and built in 1928. It was listed on the National Register of Historic Places in 2004.

Architecture
The Goldschmidt House is considered "a significant example of Paul R. Williams' residential work, and shows Williams's mastery of the second or 'Mediterranean' phase of Spanish Colonial Revival architecture."

A two-room extension was added in 1961.

See also
National Register of Historic Places listings in Orange County, California

References

Houses in Orange County, California
Houses completed in 1928
Houses on the National Register of Historic Places in California
National Register of Historic Places in Orange County, California
Colonial Revival architecture in California
Paul Williams (architect) buildings